Graham Maurice Jarrett (9 February 1937 – April 2004) was an English cricketer. Jarrett was a right-handed batsman who bowled leg breaks. He was born in Bedford, Bedfordshire and educated at Bedford Modern School.

Jarrett made his debut for Bedfordshire against Hertfordshire in the 1961 Minor Counties Championship. He played Minor counties cricket for Bedfordshire from 1961 to 1986, making 95 Minor Counties Championship appearances. He made his List A debut against Northamptonshire in the 1967 Gillette Cup. He made 6 further List A appearances, the last of which came against Northumberland in the 1977 Gillette Cup. In his 7 List A matches, he scored 26 runs at an average of 8.66, with a high score of 14 not out. With the ball, he took 6 wickets at a bowling average of 49.66, with best figures of 3/21.

He made his first-class debut for the Minor Counties against the touring Indians in 1971. He made 2 further first-class appearances, against the touring West Indians in 1973 and the touring Pakistanis in 1974. In his 3 matches, he scored 32 runs at an average of 16.00, with a high score of 24 not out. With the ball, he took 2 wickets at an expensive average of 130.00, with best figures of 2/83.

References

External links

1937 births
2004 deaths
Sportspeople from Bedford
People educated at Bedford Modern School
English cricketers
Bedfordshire cricketers
Minor Counties cricketers